María de los Dolores Asúnsolo y López Negrete (3 August 1904 – 11 April 1983), known professionally as Dolores del Río, was a Mexican actress. With a career spanning more than 50 years, she is regarded as the first major female Latin American crossover star in Hollywood. Along with a notable career in American cinema during the 1920s and 1930s, she was also considered one of the most important female figures in the Golden Age of Mexican cinema, and one of the most beautiful actresses of her era.

After being discovered in Mexico, she began her film career in Hollywood in 1925. She had roles on a string of successful films, including Resurrection (1927), Ramona (1928) and Evangeline (1929). Del Río came to be considered a sort of feminine version of Rudolph Valentino, a "female Latin Lover", in her years during the American "silent" era.

With the advent of sound, she acted in a range of film genres, from contemporary crime melodramas to musical comedies and romantic dramas. Among her most successful films of that decade include Bird of Paradise (1932), Flying Down to Rio (1933) and Madame Du Barry (1934). In the early 1940s, when her Hollywood career began to decline, Del Río returned to Mexico and joined the Mexican film industry, which at that time was at its peak.

When Del Río returned to her native country, she became one of the more important stars of the Golden Age of Mexican cinema. A series of Mexican films starring Del Rio are considered classic masterpieces and helped boost Mexican cinema worldwide. Of them stands out the critically acclaimed María Candelaria (1943). Del Río remained active mainly in Mexican films throughout the 1950s. In 1960 she returned to Hollywood. During the next years she appeared in Mexican and American films. From the late 1950s until the early 1970s she also successfully ventured into theater in Mexico and appeared in some American TV series.

Del Río is considered a quintessential representation of the female face of Mexico in the world.

Life and career

1904–1925: Childhood and first marriage 

María de los Dolores Asúnsolo y López Negrete, was born in Victoria de Durango, Mexico on 3 August 1904, daughter of Jesús Leonardo Asúnsolo Jacques, son of wealthy farmers and director of the Bank of Durango, and Antonia López Negrete, belonging to one of the richest families in the country, whose lineage went back to Spain and the viceregal nobility.

Her parents were members of the Mexican aristocracy that existed during the Porfiriato (period in the history of Mexico when the dictator Porfirio Díaz was the president). On her mother's side, she was a cousin of the filmmaker Julio Bracho and of actors Ramón Novarro (one of the "Latin Lovers" of the silent cinema) and Andrea Palma (another prominent actress of the Mexican cinema). On her father's side, she was a cousin of the Mexican sculptor Ignacio Asúnsolo and the social activist and model María Asúnsolo. Additionally, she was the aunt of the actress Diana Bracho.

Dolores's family lost all its assets during the Mexican Revolution that spanned from 1910 to 1920. Durango aristocratic families were threatened by the insurrection that Pancho Villa was leading in the region. The Asúnsolo family decided to escape, her father to the United States, and she and her mother to Mexico City on a train, disguised as peasants. In 1912, the Asúnsolo family reunited in Mexico City and lived under the protection of then-president Francisco I. Madero, who was a cousin of Antonia.

Dolores attended the Collège Français de Saint-Joseph, a college run by French nuns and located in Mexico City. She also developed a great taste for dance, that awakened in her when her mother took her to one of the Russian dancer's Ana Pavlova performances, where she was fascinated by seeing her dance and decided to become a dancer herself. She confirmed her decision later when she witnessed the performances of Antonia Mercé "La Argentina" in Mexico City. She then persuaded her mother to allow her to take dance lessons with the respected teacher Felipita López. However, she suffered from great insecurity and felt like an "ugly duckling". Her mother commissioned the renowned painter Alfredo Ramos Martínez (famous painter of the Mexican aristocracy) to paint a portrait of her daughter. The portrait helped her overcome her insecurities. In 1921, aged 17, Dolores was invited by a group of Mexican women to dance in a party to benefit a local hospital. At this party, she met Jaime Martínez del Río y Viñent, son of a wealthy family. Jaime had been educated in England and had spent some time in Europe. After a two-month courtship, the couple wed on 11 April 1921. It was from him that she inherited her artistic surname.

Her honeymoon with Jaime lasted two years and they carried it out traveling through Europe, where in a stop at Spain, Dolores danced for the kings of Spain (Alfonso XIII and Victoria Eugenie), who were fascinated to see her perform a dance performance for the soldiers of the war in Morocco.The kings thanked her deeply and the queen gave her a photograph. Returning to Mexico, Jaime decided to dedicate himself to growing cotton at Hacienda Las Cruces, in Nazas, Durango. However, a resounding fall in the world cotton market in 1924, caused an economic crisis for both and had to settle in Mexico City under the economic protection of their respective families. For her part, she had to sell her jewelry to try to recover a bit of the fortune she had lost with her husband. In addition to this, Dolores arrived pregnant when they returned to the country and had complications that could not be overcome, which caused a miscarriage and after which the doctors recommended not to get pregnant again since it would be very dangerous, taking away the possibility of having children.

1925–1929: Silent films 
In early 1925, the painter Adolfo Best Maugard, close friend of Dolores and her husband, visited their home and with him was an American filmmaker Edwin Carewe, an influential director at the First National Pictures, who was in Mexico for the wedding of actors Bert Lytell and Claire Windsor. Carewe was fascinated with Del Río and got determined to have her, so he invited the couple to work in Hollywood. He convinced Jaime, saying he could turn his wife into a movie star, "The female equivalent of Rudolph Valentino." Jaime thought that this proposal was a response to their economic needs. Deep down, he could also fulfill his old dream of writing screenplays in Hollywood. Breaking with all the canons of Mexican society at that time and against their families wishes, with the exception of Dolores's mother, they journeyed by train to the United States to start a career in film within that country. They arrived to Hollywood on 27 August of that year, where del Río was contracted by Carewe and he began to act as her agent, manager, producer and director. Her name was shortened to "Dolores Del Rio" (with an incorrect capital "D" in the word "del"). Seeking to get her a wide publicity to get the public's attention, Carewe made a report dedicated to Dolores in the major magazines in Hollywood which said:

She made her film debut in Joanna (1925), directed by Carewe and released that year. In the film del Río plays the role of Carlotta De Silva, a vamp of Spanish-Brazilian origin, but she appeared for only five minutes. While continuing with his advertising campaign for del Río, Carewe placed her with a secondary role in the film High Steppers (1926), starring Mary Astor. In the same year, Carl Laemmle, the head of Universal Studios, interested in casting del Río to act in the comedy The Whole Town's Talking. These films were not big hits, but helped increase her profile with the movie-going public. Del Rio got her first starring role in the comedy Pals First (1926) also directed by Carewe, a lost film.

The film director Raoul Walsh called del Río to cast her in the war film What Price Glory? (1926 again). The film was a commercial success, becoming the second highest-grossing title of the year, grossing nearly $2 million in the United States alone. That same year, thanks to the remarkable progress in her career, she was selected as one of the WAMPAS Baby Stars of 1926, along with fellow newcomers Joan Crawford, Mary Astor, Janet Gaynor, Fay Wray and others.

In 1927, del Río and Carewe were hired by United Artists for the film Resurrection (1927), based on the novel by Leo Tolstoy. Del Río was selected as the heroine and Rod La Rocque starred as leading man. Due to the success of the film, Fox Film quickly began shooting The Loves of Carmen with del Río and Victor McLaglen in the main roles. The film was also directed by Raoul Walsh. Fox Film also called her to star in the film No Other Woman (1928), directed by Lou Tellegen.

When actress Renée Adorée began to show symptoms of tuberculosis, del Río was selected for the lead role of the MGM film The Trail of '98, directed by Clarence Brown. The film was a huge success and brought favorable reviews from critics. Also in 1928, she was hired again by United Artists for the third film version of the successful novel Ramona, directed again by Carewe. The success of the film was helped by the same name musical theme, written by L. Wolfe Gilbert and recorded by del Río. Ramona was the first United Artists film with synchronized sound.

In late 1928, Hollywood was concerned with the conversion to sound films. On 29 March, at Mary Pickford's bungalow, United Artists brought together Pickford, del Río, Douglas Fairbanks, Charles Chaplin, Norma Talmadge, Gloria Swanson, John Barrymore, and D. W. Griffith to speak on the radio show The Dodge Brothers Hour to prove they could meet the challenge of talking movies. Del Río surprised the audience by singing "Ramona" proving to be an actress with skills for sound cinema.

Although her career blossomed, her personal life was turbulent. Her marriage to Jaime Martínez ended in 1928. After a brief separation, Dolores filed for divorce. Six months later, she received news that Jaime had died in Germany. As if this were not enough, Del Río had to suffer incessant harassment from her discoverer, Edwin Carewe, who did not cease in his attempt to conquer her.

Del Rio made her third film with Raoul Walsh, The Red Dance (1928). Her next project was Evangeline (1929) a new production of United Artists also directed by Carewe and inspired by the epic poem by Henry Wadsworth Longfellow. The film was accompanied by a theme song written by Al Jolson and Billy Rose and played by del Río. Like Ramona, the film was released with a Vitaphone disc selection of dialogue, music and sound effects.

Edwin Carewe had ambitions to marry del Río, with the intent that they become a famous Hollywood couple. Carewe prepared his divorce from his wife Mary Atkin and seeded false rumors in campaigns of his films. But during the filming of Evangeline, United Artists convinced del Río to separate herself artistically and professionally from Carewe, who still held an exclusive contract with the actress.

In New York, following the successful premiere of Evangeline, del Río declared to the reporters: "Mr. Carewe and I are just friends and companions in the art of the cinema. I will not marry Mr. Carewe." Eventually, she canceled her contract with him. Furious, Carewe filed criminal charges against Dolores. Advised by United Artists lawyers, Dolores reached an agreement with Carewe out of court. In spite of this settlement, Carewe started a campaign against her. In order to eclipse her, he filmed a new sound version of Resurrection starring Lupe Vélez, another popular Mexican film star and alleged rival of del Río.

Having finally broken off professionally from Carewe, del Río was prepared for the filming of her first talkie: The Bad One, directed by George Fitzmaurice. The film was released in June 1930 with great success. Critics said that del Río could speak and sing in English with a charming accent. She was a suitable star for the talkies.

1930–1936: Transition to sound films
In 1930, del Río met Cedric Gibbons, an art director at Metro-Goldwyn-Mayer and one of the most influential men in Hollywood, at a party at Hearst Castle. The couple began a romance and finally married on August 6, 1930. Shortly after her marriage, del Río fell seriously ill with a severe kidney infection. The doctors recommended long bed rest. This causes the end of her contract with United Artists. When she regained her health, she was hired exclusively by RKO Pictures. Her first film with the studio was Girl of the Rio released in 1931, and directed by Herbert Brenon.

Producer David O. Selznick called the filmmaker King Vidor and said: "I want del Río and Joel McCrea in a love story in the South Seas. I didn't have much of a story for the film, but be sure that it ends with the young beauty jumping into a volcano." Bird of Paradise (1932) was shot in Hawaii and del Río became a beautiful native. The film premiered on 13 September 1932 in New York, earning rave reviews. Bird of Paradise became somewhat controversial due to del Rio's daring costumes, as well as a revealing swimming scene. This film was made before the Production Code was strictly enforced.

As RKO got the result they expected, they quickly decided to have del Rio do another film, a musical comedy directed by Thornton Freeland: Flying Down to Rio of 1933. In the film, Fred Astaire and Ginger Rogers first appeared as dance partners. It featured del Río opposite Fred Astaire in an intricate dance number called Orchids in the Moonlight. In this film, del Rio became the first major actress to wear a two-piece women's bathing suit on-screen. But after the premiere, RKO were worried about their economic problems and decided not to renew del Río's contract.

Jack Warner offered her a starring role in two films for Warner Bros. The first was the musical comedy Wonder Bar (1934), directed by Lloyd Bacon. Busby Berkeley was the choreographer and Al Jolson her co-star. del Río and Jolson were gradually stealing the show. Dolores's character grew, while the character of Kay Francis, the other female star of the film, was reduced. The film was released in March 1934 and was a success for Warners.

The second one was Madame Du Barry (also 1934) with del Río as star and William Dieterle as director. Dieterle focused on her beauty with the help of an extraordinary cloakroom designed for Dolores by Orry Kelly (considered one of the most beautiful and expensive at the time). But Madame Du Barry was a major cause of dispute between the studio and the Hays Code office, primarily because it presented the court of Louis XV as a sex farce centered around del Rio. The film was severely mutilated by censorship and was not the success which had been anticipated. Even so, the film is considered one of the most popular del Río's films in her period in Hollywood cinema.

In the same year, del Río, along with Ramón Novarro and Lupe Vélez, attended a special screening of the Mexican film ¡Que viva México!. The film was directed by Sergei Eisenstein, and was accused of promoting Communism in California with nationalist sentiment and socialist overtones. It was the first time that del Río was accused of being a communist in the United States, a circumstance that would eventually have consequences in her career inside the American film industry.

Warner called her again in 1935 to star in another musical comedy called In Caliente (1935), where she portrayed a sultry Mexican dancer who has an affair with the character of actor Pat O'Brien. Around the same time, she starred in I Live for Love (also 1935), with Busby Berkeley as a director. The film had dance numbers and Berkeley focused on her glamour with a sophisticated wardrobe. The last film she made with Warners was The Widow from Monte Carlo of 1936, which went unnoticed.

1937–1942: Decline in Hollywood
With the support of Universal Studios, in 1937 del Río filmed The Devil's Playground opposite Chester Morris and Richard Dix. However, despite the popularity of the three stars, the film was a failure. Dolores would decide to emigrate and sign a contract with 20th Century Fox to star in two films with George Sanders. She appeared with him in Lancer Spy of 1937 and International Settlement of 1938. Both films were box-office failures. This cinematographic failures caused her to focus on advertising, becoming known for advertisements in "Lucky Strike" (a cigarettes brand) and "Max Factor" (a makeup brand).

Cedric Gibbons used his influence with Metro-Goldwyn-Mayer and gained for del Río the main female role in the 1940 film The Man from Dakota. But despite his position in the studio, Gibbons was never able to help his wife achieve a higher profile, as the main figures of that company at the time were Greta Garbo, Norma Shearer, Joan Crawford and Jean Harlow. Studio executives admired del Río's beauty, but her career did not interest them, as at the time, Latin stars had few opportunities to shine at the studio. She was put on a list entitled "box office poison", (along with stars like Joan Crawford, Greta Garbo, Katharine Hepburn, Marlene Dietrich, Mae West and others). The list was submitted to Los Angeles newspapers by an independent movie theater whose point was that these stars' high salaries and public prominence did not counteract the low ticket sales for their movies.

Amid the decline of her career, that same year, del Río met actor and filmmaker Orson Welles at a party organized by Darryl Zanuck. The couple felt a mutual attraction and began a discreet affair, which caused the divorce between Dolores and Gibbons. While looking for ways to resume her career, she accompanied Welles in his shows across the United States, works on radio and performances at the Mercury Theatre. del Río was at his side during the filming and controversy of Citizen Kane (1941). The film, considered a masterpiece today, caused a media scandal by directing open criticism against the media magnate William Randolph Hearst, who began to boycott Orson's projects.

At the beginning of 1942, she started working on Journey into Fear (released in 1943) with Norman Foster as director and Welles as producer. Her relationship with Welles, in the midst of the Citizen Kane scandal, somehow affected her, as her character was drastically reduced in the film. Nelson Rockefeller, in charge of the Good Neighbor policy (and also associated with RKO through his family investments), hired Welles to visit South America as an ambassador of goodwill to counter fascist propaganda about Americans. Welles left the film four days later and traveled to Rio de Janeiro as part of his goodwill tour. Welles, involved in filming the carnival in Rio de Janeiro, behaved promiscuously, and the news came soon to the United States. Offended and outraged, del Río decided to end her relationship with Welles through a telegram that he never answered. Weeks later, her father died in Mexico. Due to these personal and professional crisis, she decided to return to Mexico, commenting:

1943–1959: Mexican Cinema
Del Río had been sought by Mexican film directors since the late 1930s. She was considered to star in the Mexican films La Noche de los Mayas and Santa. Of the latter, Orson Welles himself helped correct the script.  But economic circumstances were not favorable for the entry of del Río to the Mexican cinema. She also maintained friendly ties with figures of Mexican art and culture (such as Diego Rivera and Frida Kahlo). After breaking off her relationship with Welles, del Río returned to Mexico.

As soon as she returned to her country, del Río begins to listen to movie offers. Mexican filmmaker Emilio "El Indio" Fernández invited her to film Flor silvestre (1943). Fernandez was her great admirer and he was eager to direct her. This was del Río's first Spanish-language film. The film gathers a successful film crew consisting of Fernandez, the cinematographer Gabriel Figueroa, the screenwriter Mauricio Magdaleno and del Río and Pedro Armendariz as the stars. The film was a huge box office success and allowed del Río to maintain her prestige as an actress.

Subsequently, del Río and Fernández film crew filmed María Candelaria. The film tells the story of a native indigenous woman from the lake region of Xochimilco, who is despised by her people.  Fernández has said that he wrote an original version of the plot on 13 napkins while sitting in a restaurant. He was anxious because he was in love with del Río and could not afford to buy her a birthday present. However, there were tense moments during the filming of the film. Fernández could not hide his love for del Río and, faced with her rejection of his advances, he began to be very demanding and violent. Del Río showed great professionalism and finished filming, despite several threats to abandon the film. María Candelaria was the first Mexican film to be screened at the Cannes International Film Festival where it won the Grand Prix (now known as the Palme d'Or) becoming the first Latin American film to do so. For del Rio, the film meant success in her native country.

Her third film with Fernández Las Abandonadas (1944), was a then controversial film where del Río plays a woman who gives up her son and falls into the world of prostitution. The film was about to be banned due to protests from the Mexican army, because the film spoke of a criminal gang infiltrated in the Mexican armed forces. These controversies ensured the film's box office success. She won the Silver Ariel (Mexican Academy Award) as best actress for her role in the film.

Bugambilia (1944) was her fourth movie directed by Fernández. As del Rio did not correspond to the director's love advances, Bugambilia filming became a torture for both and for the rest of the team, who had to endure the mood swings of the director and the constant threats of del Río leaving the film. When the film was completed in January 1945, del Río announced that she would never again work with "El Indio" Fernández.

Del Río filmed La selva de fuego (1945) directed by Fernando de Fuentes. The script of this film came to her in error, because of a confused messaging. The film had been specially created for María Félix, another Mexican movie star of the day. Félix meanwhile, received the script for Dizziness (1946), a film originally created for del Río. When the two stars realized the mistake they refused to return the scripts. Del Río was fascinated by playing a different character which also involved her in daring scenes with the Mexican actor Arturo de Córdova. From this time the press began speculating a strong rivalry between del Río and Felix.

After breaking off her film collaboration with Emilio Fernández, del Río began a film partnership with director Roberto Gavaldón. Del Río plays twin sisters in the film La Otra (1946), her first film under Gavaldón's direction. This film later inspired the movie Dead Ringer, starring Bette Davis in 1964.

In 1947, del Río was invited by the film director John Ford to play the role of an indigenous woman who helps a fugitive priest (Henry Fonda) in the film The Fugitive, an adaptation of the novel The Power and the Glory by Graham Greene. Emilio Fernández also served as associate producer and Gabriel Figueroa was the cinematographer. The movie was filmed in Mexico. Del Río was attacked again for having taken part in what was being called "a communist project". 
 
In the same period, she traveled to Argentina to film Story of a Bad Woman (Historia de una mala mujer, 1948), a film adaptation of the Oscar Wilde's Lady Windermere's Fan, directed by Luis Saslavsky. While shooting in Buenos Aires in 1947, del Río was pursued by none other than First Lady Evita Peron. Peron invited del Río to tea, but del Río declined because of her filmmaking schedule. The next day, the government issued an order that the film industry was to shut down completely so del Río could have tea with Mrs. Peron. Rumors about her involvement in issues linked to communism sounded the alarm in Hollywood. In an interview with Hedda Hopper from Argentina, del Río claimed to be unconcerned about the controversy surrounding The Fugitive. According to Hopper, "Dolores said controversy added millions of pesos to the profit of the picture".

Del Río accepted working again with Emilio Fernández and her film team in the film La Malquerida (1949). The film is based on the novel of the Spanish writer Jacinto Benavente. Del Río gained good notices for her portrayal of Raymunda, a woman confronted by her own daughter for the love of a man. The role of her daughter was played by actress Columba Dominguez. Domínguez was Fernández's new romantic partner, and this situation caused tension on the set and speculation from the press.  That year she also met the American millionaire Lewis A. Riley in Acapulco and they started a romance. Del Río was directed again by Roberto Gavaldón in two films: The Little House (La casa chica, 1950) and Desired (Deseada, 1951). That same year, del Río's cousin, activist Maria Asúnsolo, asked her to sign a document for a "conference for the world peace". Del Río never imagined that said document would point her out again as a supporter of international communism.

Del Río starred in Doña Perfecta (1951), based on the novel by Benito Perez Galdos. For this work she won her second Silver Ariel Award for Best Actress. Gavaldón directed her again in the film El Niño y la Niebla (1953). Her portrayal of an overprotective mother with a mental instability attracted critical acclaim and she was honored with her third Silver Ariel Award.

In 1954, del Río was slated to appear as the wife of Spencer Tracy's character in the 20th Century Fox film Broken Lance. The U.S. government denied her permission to work in the United States, accusing her of being sympathetic to international communism. The document signed by her cheering for world peace, as well as her links with figures openly communist (as Diego Rivera and Frida Kahlo were) and her past relationship with Orson Welles, had been interpreted in the United States as sympathy with communism. She was replaced in the film by Katy Jurado. She reacted by sending a letter to the U.S. government, stating:

While her situation was being remedied in the United States, del Río accepted the proposal of filming in Spain another adaptation of a novel by Benavente, Señora Ama (1955), directed by her cousin, the filmmaker Julio Bracho. Unfortunately the prevailing censorship in the Spanish cinema caused the film to be seriously truncated during editing.

In 1956, her political situation in the United States was resolved. She began to listen with interest to theatrical offerings. Del Río was already thinking that the play Anastacia of Marcelle Maurette, would be a good choice for her debut. To prepare for this new facet of her career, she engaged the services of Stella Adler as her acting coach. Del Río debuted successfully at the theater on the Falmouth Playhouse in Massachusetts on July 6, 1956 and to continue with a tour of seven other theaters throughout New England. She took advantage of her return to the United States and granted an interview to Louella Parsons to make clear her political position: "In Mexico we are worried and fighting against communism." In 1957, she was selected as vice president of the jury of the 1957 Cannes Film Festival. She was the first woman to sit on the jury. In 1957, she debuted in television in the role of a Spanish lady in the American television series Schlitz Playhouse of Stars, with Cesar Romero as co-star.

In 1959, Mexican filmmaker Ismael Rodríguez brought del Río and María Félix together in the film La Cucaracha. The meeting of the two actresses, considered the main female stars of Mexican cinema, was a success at the box office. Although the press speculated that a war would break out between the two actresses, the truth is that the filming went smoothly and both ended up forming friendly ties. That same year, she married Lewis Riley in a private ceremony in New York.

1960–1970: Return to Hollywood, television and theatre

Del Río and her husband founded their own production company called Producciones Visuales. and they produced numerous theater projects featuring del Río. Mexican writer Salvador Novo became the translator of her plays. Her first production in Mexico City was Oscar Wilde's Lady Windermere's Fan, which she had made as a film in Argentina a decade earlier. She toured Mexico in the play, an enterprise that was both financially and critically successful, and she later took it to Buenos Aires. In 1958, the play The Road to Rome, would mark the reunion in the theater of the film couple del Río-Pedro Armendáriz. But the temperamental Armendáriz left the project in rehearsals due to differences with the director. He was replaced by another actor, but the project did not prosper and was a failure at the box office.

Del Río returned to Hollywood after 18 years. She was hired by Fox to play the role of the mother of Elvis Presley's character in the film Flaming Star (1960), directed by Don Siegel. She appeared in John Ford's Cheyenne Autumn released in 1964. In 1967, the Italian filmmaker Francesco Rosi invited her to be part of the movie More Than a Miracle (also 1967) with Sophia Loren and Omar Sharif. She played Sharif's character's mother.

Throughout the 1960s, del Río produced and starred in Mexico in theater projects such as Ghosts (1962), Dear Liar: A Comedy of Letters (1963), La Voyante (1964) and The Queen and the Rebels (1967)

She also appeared in the TV shows The Dinah Shore Chevy Show (1960), the TV movie The Man Who Bought Paradise (1965), I Spy and Branded (1966). In 1968, del Río first performed on Mexican television in an autobiographical documentary narrated by her.

In 1970, she produced and starred in theater The Lady of the Camellias. The project was originally directed by the Broadway producer José Quintero. However, despite having received a high salary, the producer did not commit to the project and constantly appeared drunk. Del Río and her husband decided to fire him and were legally sued by the director. The matter was cleared up in court and delayed the premiere of the play, which was a great box office success, despite production problems. Del Río was acclaimed at daring to play a 65-year-old Marguerite Gautier.
Her last appearance on television was in a 1970 episode of Marcus Welby, M.D..

1970–1983: Philanthropy and cultural ambassador
Since the late 1950s, del Río became a main promoter of the Acapulco International Film Review, serving as host on numerous occasions. In 1966, del Río was co-founder of the Society for the Protection of the Artistic Treasures of Mexico with the philanthropist Felipe García Beraza. The society was responsible for protecting buildings, paintings and other works of art and culture in México.

On January 8, 1970, she, in collaboration with other renowned Mexican actresses, founded the union group "Rosa Mexicano", which provided a day nursery for the children of the members of the Mexican Actor's Guild. Del Río was responsible for various activities to raise funds for the project and she trained in modern teaching techniques. She served as the president from its founding until 1981. After her death, the day nursery adopted the official name of Estancia Infantil Dolores del Río (The Dolores del Río Day Nursery), and today remains in existence.

In 1972, she helped found the Cultural Festival Cervantino in Guanajuato. Her deteriorating health led her to cancel two television projects in 1975. The American television series Who'll See the Children? and Mexican telenovela Ven Amigo. In her work in supporting children she became a spokeswoman of the UNICEF in Latin America and records a series of television commercials for the organization. In 1976 she served as president of the jury in the San Sebastian Film Festival.

In 1978, Dolores makes her last film appearance in the film The Children of Sanchez, directed by Hall Bartlett and starring Anthony Quinn. There she interprets the role of the grandmother. In the same year, the Mexican American Institute of Cultural Relations and the White House gave Dolores a diploma and a silver plaque for her work in cinema as a cultural ambassador of Mexico in the United States. During the ceremony she was remembered as a victim of McCarthyism.

At the age of 76, del Río appeared on the stage of the Palace of Fine Arts theater the evening of October 11, 1981 for a tribute at the 25th San Francisco International Film Festival. During the ceremony, filmmakers Francis Ford Coppola, Mervyn LeRoy and George Cukor spoke, with Cukor declaring del Rio the "First Lady of American Cinema". This was her last known public appearance. In 1982, she was awarded the George Eastman Award, given by George Eastman House for distinguished contribution to the art of film.

Beauty 

Del Río always projected a special elegance with her beauty, more than just a "Latin bombshell" such as other actresses like Lupe Vélez. Del Rio's intrinsic elegance was apparent even off-screen. Del Río strongly identified with her Mexican heritage despite her growing fame and her transition to "modernity". She also felt strongly about being able to play Mexican roles and bemoaned the fact that she was not cast in them. She never relinquished her Mexican citizenship and said in 1929 (at the height of her popularity) that she wanted "to play a Mexican woman and show what life in Mexico really is. No one has shown the artistic side – nor the social".

Del Río was considered one of the prototypes of female beauty in the 1930s. In 1933, the American film magazine Photoplay conducted a search for "the most perfect female figure in Hollywood", using the criteria of doctors, artists and designers as judges. The "unanimous choice" of these selective arbiters of female beauty was Del Río. The question posed by the search for the magazine and the methodology used to find "the most perfect female figure" reveal a series of parameters that define femininity and feminine beauty at that particular moment in the US history. Larry Carr (author of the book More Fabulous Faces) said Del Río's appearance in the early 1930s influenced Hollywood. Women imitated her style of dress and makeup. A new kind of beauty occurred, and Del Río was the forerunner. Dolores Del Rio imitated Joan Crawford’s makeup and hairstyles. Indeed, she even imitated Crawford’s photographic poses. She is also considered the pioneer of the two piece swimsuit.

According to Austrian-American filmmaker Josef von Sternberg, stars such as Del Río, Marlene Dietrich, Carole Lombard and Rita Hayworth helped him to define his concept of the glamour in Hollywood.

When Del Río returned to Mexico, she radically changed her image. In Hollywood, she had lost ground to the modernity of the faces. In Mexico, she had the enormous fortune that filmmaker Emilio Fernández emphasized Mexican indigenous features. She did not come to Mexico as the Hollywood "Latin bombshell" transforming her makeup to highlight her indigenous features. Del Río defined the change that her appearance suffered in her native country: "I took off my furs and diamonds, satin shoes and pearl necklaces; all swapped by the shawl and bare feet."

Del Río's contemporaries comment about her image:

American actress Joan Crawford: "Dolores became, and remains, as one of the most beautiful stars in the world".

German-American actress and singer Marlene Dietrich: "Dolores del Río was the most beautiful woman who ever set foot in Hollywood". “Ah, this is the real beauty. We blondes have to work at it".

Playwright George Bernard Shaw: "The two most beautiful things in the world are the Taj Mahal and Dolores del Río".

Fashion designer Elsa Schiaparelli: "I have seen many beautiful women in here, but none as complete as Dolores del Río!"

Mexican painter Diego Rivera: "The most beautiful, the most gorgeous of the west, east, north and south. I'm in love with her as 40 million Mexicans and 120 million Americans who can't be wrong".

Mexican novelist Carlos Fuentes: "Garbo and Dietrich were women turned into goddesses. Del Río was a goddess about being a woman".

American photographer Jerome Zerbe: "Dolores del Río and Marlene Dietrich are the most beautiful women I've ever photographed".

Australian-American costume designer Orry-Kelly: "I draped her naked body in jersey. She wanted no underpinnings to spoil the line. When I finished draping her she became a Greek goddess as she walked close to the mirror and said, It is beautiful. Gazing into the mirror, she said in a half-whisper, Jesus, I am beautiful. Narcissistic? Probably yes, but she was right. She looked beautiful".

Mexican cinematographer Gabriel Figueroa: "I have had great beauties in front of my camera. But the facial bones of Dolores del Río are incomparable. That has been said many times. What has not been said is that she had a privileged smooth skin, a beautiful brown color and a body really perfect".

American actor and director Orson Welles: "Del Río represented the highest erotic ideal with her performance in the film Bird of Paradise.

Del Río herself commented on her face and image: "Take care of your inner beauty, your spiritual beauty, and that will reflect in your face. We have the face we created over the years. Every bad deed, every bad fault will show on your face. God can give us beauty and genes can give us our features, but whether that beauty remains or changes is determined by our thoughts and deeds."

In 1952, she was awarded the Neiman Marcus Fashion Award and was called the "best-dressed woman in America".

Personal life 
She married Jaime Martínez del Río in 1921. Her marriage ended in 1928. The differences between the couple emerged after settling in Hollywood. In Mexico she had been the wife of Jaime Martinez del Río, but in Hollywood Jaime became husband of a movie star. The trauma of a miscarriage added to the marital difficulties and del Río was advised not to have children. After a brief separation, Dolores filed for divorce. Six months later, she received news that Jaime had died in Germany.

In 1930, del Río met Cedric Gibbons, an art director at Metro-Goldwyn-Mayer and one of the most influential men in Hollywood, at a party at Hearst Castle. The couple began a romance and finally married on August 6, 1930. The del Rio-Gibbons were one of the most famous couples of Hollywood in the early thirties. They organized 'Sunday brunches' in their Art Deco house at 757 Kingman Avenue in the Rustic Canyon neighborhood of Pacific Palisades. Many celebrities would attend and play tennis or swim in the pool including Marlene Dietrich, Greta Garbo, and Cary Grant.  The couple divorced in 1941.

In 1949 she met the American millionaire Lewis A. Riley in Acapulco. Riley was known in the Hollywood cinema in the forties for being a member of the Hollywood Canteen, an organization created by movie stars to support relief efforts in World War II. At that time Riley was engaged in a torrid affair with Bette Davis. Del Río and Riley started a romance. In 1959, the couple married in New York after ten years of relationship. They remained together until her death in 1983.

Regardless of her marriages, at different times in her life, she was romantically linked with actor Errol Flynn, filmmaker John Farrow, writer Erich Maria Remarque, film producer Archibaldo Burns, and actor Tito Junco.
Mexican filmmaker Emilio Fernández was one of her admirers. He said that he had appeared as an extra in several films of Dolores in Hollywood just to be near her. The beauty and elegance of del Río had impressed him deeply. Fernández said: "I fell in love with her, but she always ignored me. I adored her... really I adored her."

Orson Welles 

Del Río met actor and filmmaker Orson Welles at a party organized by Darryl Zanuck. The couple felt a mutual attraction and began a discreet affair. Welles was infatuated with her since adolescence. Welles declared: “That’s when I fell in love with her”. He later said: “She changed my life”. Their relationship was kept secret until 1941, when del Río filed for divorce from Cedric Gibbons. They openly appeared together in New York while Welles was directing the Mercury stage production Native Son. After del Río filed for divorce, she threw herself into Welles’ chaotic world, considering his intellect “second to none, not even Shakespeare.” Welles was equally complimentary. “She lives so graciously. Everyone around her loves her. She is the one girl you can be with and not feel the need for conversation. She has a mind full of talk, though, when she wants”. Throughout the filming of Citizen Kane, del Río was often at the difficult Welles’ side, soothing him when he banged his head against the wall and dealing with his insomnia as he abused Dexedrine. They acted together in the movie Journey into Fear (1943).

Her relationship with Welles ended after four years largely due to his infidelities. Welles, involved in filming the carnival in Rio de Janeiro, behaved promiscuously and the news came soon to the United States. Offended and outraged, del Río decided to end her relationship with Welles through a telegram that he never answered. He married later with Rita Hayworth, "The New Dolores del Río of Hollywood".

But Welles never got over her completely, and off and on he went to Mexico in usually fruitless attempts to see her, or sent his children, whom she did receive.
Rebecca Welles, the daughter of Welles and Hayworth, expressed her desire to travel to Mexico to meet Dolores on her 18th birthday. In 1962, Dolores received her at her home in Acapulco. After their meeting, Rebecca said: "My father considered Dolores the great love of his life. She is a living legend in the history of my family." According to Rebecca, until the end of his life, Welles felt for del Río a kind of obsession. 
For the rest of her life del Río kept a card with two beautiful slanted eyes (easily identifiable as Dolores’s own) and a dove drawing along a banner inscribed with the word "always" and signed "Orson".

Alleged rivalries
There are many anecdotes about her rivalry with Lupe Vélez. Del Río never understood the quarrel that Vélez kept with her. Vélez hated del Río, and called her "bird of bad omen". Del Río was terrified to meet her in public places. When this happened, Vélez was scathing and aggressive. Vélez openly mimicked del Río, ironically making fun of her elegance. But the prestige of del Río was known and respected, and Vélez could not ignore this. Vélez wore spectacular costumes, but never reached del Río's supreme elegance. Vélez was popular, had many friends and devoted fans, but never attended the social circle in Hollywood, where del Río was accepted without reservations. Vélez spoke ill of del Río, but del Río never mentioned her name in an offensive way. Vélez evidently resented Del Rio's success during the years in which both met in Hollywood.

There was media speculation about a strong rivalry between Del Rio and María Félix, another diva of the Mexican Cinema. Félix said in her autobiography: "With Dolores I don't have any rivalry. On the contrary. We were friends and we always treated each other with great respect. We were completely different. She [was] refined, interesting, soft on the deal, and I'm more energetic, arrogant and bossy". Félix said in another interview: "Dolores del Río was a great lady. She behaved like a princess. A very intelligent and very funny woman. I appreciate her very much and I have great memories of her".

Death 

In 1978, she was diagnosed with osteomyelitis, and in 1981, with hepatitis B following a contaminated injection of vitamins. She also suffered from arthritis. In 1982, del Río was admitted to Scripps Hospital, La Jolla, California, where hepatitis led to cirrhosis.

On April 11, 1983, Dolores del Río died from liver failure at the age of 78 in Newport Beach, California. It is said that the day she died, an invitation to attend the Oscars was sent to her. She was cremated and her ashes were moved from the United States to Mexico where they were buried at the Panteón de Dolores in Mexico City, Mexico, specifically on The Rotunda of Illustrious Persons.

Legacy 
Del Río was the first Mexican actress to succeed in Hollywood. In her wake others followed including Lupe Vélez, Katy Jurado and Lupita Tovar In recent years other Mexican stars that have achieved a place in Hollywood include Salma Hayek, Eiza González, and Adriana Barraza

In art and literature 

The physical characteristics of del Río made her a figure of veneration even beyond death. From a young age, del Río had the intelligence to know how to surround herself with personalities of the intellectual environment. The Hollywood myth placed del Río in another area, as she became one of the women related to the renaissance of Mexican culture and customs.

The face of del Río was also the object of veneration for many artists who shaped her image on their canvases. In 1916, when del Río was 11 years old, she was first portrayed by Alfredo Ramos Martínez, a very popular artist among Mexican high society. In the 1920s, del Río was also embodied in the canvases of Mexican painters Roberto Montenegro and Ángel Zárraga. In 1938, the actress was portrayed by her close friend, the famous Mexican artist Diego Rivera. The portrait was made in New York. It was del Río's favorite portrait and occupied a special place in her home in Mexico. Rivera also captured the image of Dolores in some of his paintings and murals, highlighting La vendedorea de flores, La pollera and La Creacion. In this last mural, located in the Colegio de San Ildefonso, in Mexico City, the actress represents "Justice".

In 1941, del Río was also portrayed by the famous Mexican muralist José Clemente Orozco. The portrait was made at the request of Orson Welles. Unfortunately, when the artist painted the portrait he was already losing his sight. del Río said: "He painted his tragedy on my face!" Although the portrait was not liked by the actress, it had a very important place in her home. Other artists who recorded her image in her paintings were Miguel Covarrubias, Rosa Rolanda, Antonieta Figueroa, Frances Gauner Goshman, Adolfo Best Maugard and John Carroll.

In 1970, the Instituto Nacional de Bellas Artes y Literatura, the Mexico's Screen Actors Guild, the Humane Society of the Artistic Treasures of Mexico and the Motion Picture Export Association of America paid her a tribute titled Dolores del Rio in the Art in which her main portraits and a sculpture by Francisco Zúñiga were exhibited.

In her will, del Río stipulated that all her artworks be donated to the National Institute of Fine Arts and Literature of Mexico, for display in various museums in Mexico City, including the National Museum of Art, the Museum of Art Carillo Gil and the Home-Studio of Diego Rivera and Frida Kahlo.

Del Río was the model of the statue of Evangeline, the heroine of Longfellow's romantic poem located in St. Martinville, Louisiana. The statue was donated by del Río, who played Evangeline in the 1929 film.

Poet Salvador Novo wrote her a sonnet and translated all her stage plays. She inspired Jaime Torres Bodet's novel La Estrella de Día (Star of the Day), published in 1933, which chronicles the life of an actress named "Piedad". Vicente Leñero was inspired by del Río to write his book, Señora. Carlos Pellicer also wrote her a poem in 1967. In 1982, del Río and Maria Félix were parodied in the novel Orchids in the Moonlight: Mexican Comedy by Carlos Fuentes. Other authors who wrote her poems were Xavier Villaurrutia, Celestino Gorostiza and Pita Amor. Carlos Monsiváis and Jorge Ayala Blanco also made her a tribute book on the occasion of the Ibero-American Film Festival of Huelva, in 1983. The book contains an essay by Monsiváis entitled Responsibilities of a face. Vicente Leñero also pays tribute to the book Señora.

After her death, her photo archive was given to the Carso Center for the Study of Mexican History by Lewis Riley.

Memorials 

 She has her star on the Hollywood Walk of Fame at 1630 Vine Street in recognition of her contributions to the motion picture industry.
 Dolores del Río also has a statue at Hollywood-La Brea Boulevard in Los Angeles, designed by Catherine Hardwicke built to honor the multi-ethnic leading ladies of the cinema together with Mae West, Dorothy Dandridge and Anna May Wong.
 Del Río has also a mural painted on the east side of Hudson Avenue just north of Hollywood Boulevard painted by the Mexican-American artist Alfredo de Batuc.
 Del Río is one of the entertainers displayed in the mural "Portrait of Hollywood", designed in 2002 by the artist Eloy Torrez in the Hollywood High School.
 Del Río's memory is honored in three monuments in Mexico City. The first is a statue located in the second section of Chapultepec Park. The other two are busts. One is located in the Parque Hundido. and the other is in the nursery that bears her name.
 In Durango, Mexico, her hometown, an avenue is named after her, Blvd. Dolores del Río.
 Since 1983, the society Periodistas Cinematográficos de México (Mexican Film Journalists) (PECIME) has been giving the Diosa de Plata (Dolores del Río) Award for the best dramatic female performance.
 In 1995, fashion designer John Galliano realized a tribute to del Rio in his Fall /Winter collection Dolores.
 In 2005, on what was believed to be the centenary of her birth (she was actually born in 1904), her remains were moved to the Rotonda de las Personas Ilustres in Mexico City.
 On 3 August 2017, the 113th anniversary of her birth, Google released a Google Doodle created by Google artist Sophie Diao honoring Del Río.
 After her death, actor Vincent Price used to sign his autographs as "Dolores del Río". When asked why, the actor replied: "I promised Dolores on her deathbed that I would not let people forget about her."

Characterizations 
 Chester Gould, the creator of Dick Tracy, took Dolores del Río as inspiration to create Texie Garcia, one of Tracy's main enemies.
 She appeared in vintage footage in the Woody Allen's film Zelig (1983).
 She was played by the actress Lucy Cohu in the TV film RKO 281 in 1999.
 Del Río is one of the Mexican celebrities honored in a cameo in the Disney-Pixar animated movie Coco in 2017.
 She was played by the actress Elsa Ortiz in the streaming series María Félix: La Doña, produced by TelevisaUnivision.

Filmography 

Selected:

 Joanna (1925)
 What Price Glory? (1926)
 Resurrection (1927)
 The Loves of Carmen (1927)
 Ramona (1928)
 Evangeline (1929)
 Bird of Paradise (1932)
 Flying Down to Rio (1933)
 Wonder Bar (1934)
 Madame Du Barry (1934)
 In Caliente (1935)
 Devil's Playground (1937)
 Journey Into Fear (1943)
 Wild Flower (1943)
 María Candelaria (1943)
 Las Abandonadas (1944)
 Bugambilia (1944)
 La Otra (1946)
 The Fugitive (1947)
 The Unloved Woman (1949)
 Doña Perfecta (1951)
 El Niño y la niebla (1953)
 La Cucaracha (1959)
 Flaming Star (1960)
 Cheyenne Autumn (1964)
 More Than a Miracle (1967)
 The Children of Sanchez (1978)

Selected theatre roles:

 Anastacia (1956)
 Lady Windermere's Fan (1958)
 The Road to Rome (1959)
 Ghosts (1962)
 Dear Liar: A Comedy of Letters (1963)
 The Lady of the Camellias (1968)

See also

References

Citations

Sources 
 
 
 
 
 
 
 
 
 
 
 
 
 
 
 
 
 
 
 
 
 

Magazines
 

Dolores del Río: El Rostro del Cine Mexicano, Revista SOMOS México, 1994, ed. Televisa, pp. 70–72
 
 
Dolores del Río: La Mexicana Divina, Revista SOMOS México, 2002, ed. Televisa, pg. 71

Further reading

External links 

 
 
 
 Dolores del Río at the Cinema of Mexico site of the ITESM 
 Dolores del Río profile, Virtual-History.com
 The Dolores del Rio mural 1990 by artist Alfredo de Batuc, 6529 Hollywood Boulevard + Hudson St, Los Angeles, California 
 Dolores del Rio statue on Hollywood-La Brea Boulevard 
 Photographs of Dolores del Rio

1904 births
1983 deaths
20th-century Mexican actresses
20th Century Studios contract players
Actresses from Durango
American actresses of Mexican descent
American silent film actresses
Ariel Award winners
Golden Age of Mexican cinema
Golden Ariel Award winners
Hispanic and Latino American actresses
Metro-Goldwyn-Mayer contract players
Mexican artists' models
Mexican emigrants to the United States
Mexican female dancers
Mexican film actresses
Mexican humanitarians
Women humanitarians
Mexican people of Basque descent
Mexican people of French descent
Mexican people of Spanish descent
Mexican silent film actresses
Mexican stage actresses
People from Durango City
Warner Bros. contract players
WAMPAS Baby Stars